Periclimenes sagittifer is a crustacean first described by Norman 1861.  Periclimenes sagittifer included in the family Palaemonidae. No subspecies listed in the Catalogue of Life.

Description 

A transparent body except for the typical violet arrow on the abdomen, the legs have coloring of yellow and blue alternately, and the tail is characterized by a blue arrow. Up to 25 mm. They live in symbiosis with sea anemones such snakelocks anemone (Anemonia sulcata), Aiptasia mutabilis, Cribrinopsis crass and Condylactis aurantiaca, feeding on the detritus.

Distribution and habitat 

Atlantic Ocean and the eastern Mediterranean Sea.

References 

Palaemonidae